Architectural Digest (also known as AD) is an architecture magazine based in Munich, Germany. The magazine is the German edition of the US magazine with the same name. It is the third edition of the magazine after the US and Italian editions.

History and profile
Architectural Digest was established in 1996. The first issue appeared in January 1997. The magazine was started as a bi-monthly publication. The owner of the magazine is Condé Nast. It is published by Condé Nast Verlag GmbH ten times a year and covers articles related to architecture and interior design. 

The headquarters of Architectural Digest was first in Munich. Then it moved to Berlin, but then its headquarters returned to Munich.

Ulrike Filter was the launching editor-in-chief of Architectural Digest. Ingrid von Werz replaced her in the post in November 1999. Her term ended in July 2000 when Margit J. Mayer was named the editor-in-chief of the magazine. As of 2016 Oliver Jahn was the editor-in-chief of the magazine.

Architectural Digest is the media partner of the Highlights, an international art fair in Munich.

References

External links
 Official website

1996 establishments in Germany
Architecture magazines
Bi-monthly magazines published in Germany
Condé Nast magazines
Design magazines
German-language magazines
Magazines established in 1996
Magazines published in Berlin
Magazines published in Munich
Ten times annually magazines
Visual arts magazines published in Germany